O-4310 (1-isopropyl-6-fluoro-psilocin) is a tryptamine derivative developed by Organix Inc which acts as a serotonin receptor agonist. It is claimed to have an EC50 of 5nM at 5-HT2A with 89% efficacy vs 5-HT, and 100x selectivity over 5-HT2C, while being apparently inactive at the 5-HT2B antitarget.

See also
 1-Methylpsilocin
 5-Fluoro-DMT
 Psilocin
 SCHEMBL5334361
 7-F-5-MeO-MET

References

Tryptamines
Fluoroarenes
Isopropyl compounds
Dimethylamino compounds
Phenols